{{safesubst:#invoke:RfD|||month = March
|day = 19
|year = 2023
|time = 14:44
|timestamp = 20230319144414

|content=
REDIRECT Perspective distortion

}}